Kiyoaki Hanai is a Japanese race car driver. Hanai competed in one round of the 1997 FIA GT Championship, and two rounds of the 1997 All-Japan Grand Touring Car Championship, driving for Team Signal. His best finish was 29th, at the 300 km of Suzuka.

References

Japanese racing drivers
Living people
Year of birth missing (living people)